Little Big Man was a chief of the Oglala Lakota.

Little Big Man may also refer to:

 Little Big Man (novel), a 1964 novel by Thomas Berger
 Little Big Man (film), a 1970 film based on the novel, directed by Arthur Penn and starring Dustin Hoffman
 Little Big Man (album), a 1992 album by Bushwick Bill
 Little Big Man (Jakeun gochu), a 1986 South Korean film starring Choi Jae-sung

See also 
 Big man (disambiguation)
 Little man (disambiguation)